The Sandringham Dragons are an Australian rules football club playing in the NAB League, the top statewide under-18 competition in Victoria, Australia.  They are based at the Trevor Barker Oval in Sandringham, Victoria, representing the southern suburban area of Melbourne.  The Dragons were one of the founding metropolitan clubs of the competition in 1992 as part of a plan by the Victorian State Football League to replace the traditional club zones with independent junior clubs.  This was to help aid in player development and the process of the AFL draft.

The club was originally named the Central Dragons and played out of Toorak Oval in Prahran, Victoria. In 1995 the name of the club was changed to Prahran Dragons as part of the agreement which saw the Prahran Two Blues exit the senior Victorian Football League. In 2000, the club relocated to the Trevor Barker Beach Oval in Sandringham and changed its name for the new locality.

AFL Draftees History

1992: Tim Scott-Branagan, Aaron Lord, Matthew Jackson, Adam Williamson, Mathew Moon North,
1993: Scott Mollard, Julian Kirzner, Simon Garlick, Sedat Sir, Simon Beaumont, Justin Murphy
1994: David Bourke, Carl Steinfort, John Rombotis, Marty Warry, Matthew Robbins
1995: Nick Jewell, Jason Cripps, Brent Williams
1996: Brett O'Farrell, Will Sangster
1997: John Hynes,
1998: David Gallagher, Danny Jacobs, Troy Schwarze
1999: David Spriggs, Ezra Poyas, Jason Blake, Mark Ainley, Jeremy Dukes, Nick Stone, Damien Lyon, Mark Wittison, Olly Trand
2000: Dylan Smith, Nick Ries, Ted Richards, Steven Greene, Luke Hammond, Scott Thornton, Michael Davis, Matthew Ball, Leigh Harrison
2001: Luke Ball, Chris Judd, Charlie Gardiner, Rod Crowe, Ben Schwarze, Mark Dubyna
2002: Darren Walsh, Jobe Watson, Leigh Fisher 
2003: Fergus Watts, Luke Peel, Andrew Eriksen
2004: Thomas Murphy, Will Thursfield, Joseph Krieger
2005: Robert Warnock, Simon Buckley, Matt Thomas, Daniel Hughes , Simon Phillips
2006: Josh P. Kennedy, Tom Hawkins
2007: Myke Cook, Luke Casey-Leigh, John Shaw, Shane Valenti 
2008: Jack Watts, Ty Vickery, Tom Lynch, Mitchell Brown, Taylor Hunt, Luke Lowden, Taylor Gilchrist, Samuel McGarry, Matt Suckling
2009: Jack Gunston, Max Gawn
2010: Ben Jacobs, Daniel Farmer, Jarryd Lyons, Declan Reilly
2011: Liam Sumner, Jackson Paine, Alex Woodward, Fletcher Roberts, Sam Frost, Ben Darrou
2012: James Stewart, Tom Temay, Xavier Richards
2013: Josh Kelly, Nathan Freeman, Zach Merrett, Tom Langdon, Karl Amon, Kurt Heatherley
2014: Angus Brayshaw, Brayden Maynard, Ed Vickers-Willis, Ed Langdon, Harry Dear, Josh Clayton, Michael Manteit, Sean McLaren, Will Fordham
2015: Harley Balic
2016: Andrew McGrath, Tim Taranto, Will Setterfield, Jack Scrimshaw, Oliver Florent, Cameron Polson, Corey Lyons, Lachlan Filipovic
2017: Andrew Brayshaw, Will Walker, Charlie Constable, Nathan Murphy, Hamish Brayshaw, Angus Styles, Joel Amartey
2018: Max King, Ben King, Bailey Smith, Liam Stocker, Joel Crocker, Harry Reynolds
2019: Fischer McAsey, Miles Bergman, Josh Worrell, Finn Maginness, Jack Mahony, Hugo Ralphsmith, Ryan Byrnes, Louis Butler, Jack Bell
2020: Archie Perkins, Max Holmes, Jake Bowey, Fraser Rosman, Ollie Lord
2021: Finn Callaghan, Josh Sinn, Campbell Chesser, Mitchito Owens, Blake Howes,Marcus Windhager, Dante Visentini, Luke Cleary
2022: Will Ashcroft, Harry Sheezel, Cam MacKenzie, Charlie Clarke,	Toby McMullin, Olli Hotton

Honours
Premierships (4): 1999, 2011, 2016, 2022
Runners-up (1): 2017
Wooden Spoons (4): 1992, 1996, 2007, 2009

References

External links

Sandringham Dragons Website

NAB League clubs
1992 establishments in Australia

Australian rules football clubs in Melbourne
Sport in the City of Bayside
Australian rules football clubs established in 1992